The Phoenix Elementary School District #1 (PESD) is a kindergarten through 8th grade school district in Phoenix, Arizona, United States. It was established in 1871 as the first free public school district in Arizona. The district boundaries cover an area from 16th Street on the east, south of Buckeye Road on the south, past 23rd Avenue on the west and Thomas Road on the north. Student services include: speech and language therapy, social and psychological services, services for the hearing and visually impaired, gifted education, and special education.  Each school has a nurse or nurse's assistant on staff. Students of working parents are offered free before and after school care for their students.

As of 2016 the superintendent is Mr. Larry Weeks

Students feed into the Phoenix Union High School District.

In 2015 the district considered closing Shaw Elementary School due to a deficit of over $800,000.

Elementary schools
 Bethune
 Capitol
 Dunbar
 Edison
 Emerson
 Faith North Preschool
 Garfield
 Heard
 Herrera
 Kenilworth
 Lowell
 Magnet Traditional School
 Shaw Montessori
 Whittier

References

External links
 Official website

School districts in Phoenix, Arizona
School districts in Maricopa County, Arizona
1871 establishments in Arizona Territory
School districts established in 1871